Thomas Curtis Hills (1884-1963), was an English bowls player who competed in three British Empire Games.

Bowls career
At the 1930 British Empire Games he won the gold medal in the pairs event with George Wright. The pair repeated the success four years later at the 1934 British Empire Games. He also competed at the 1938 British Empire Games in the singles, where he finished fourth.

Personal life
He was an auctioneer and estate agent by trade and married Beatrice Nellie Foster, they lived in Lewisham.

References

English male bowls players
Bowls players at the 1930 British Empire Games
Bowls players at the 1934 British Empire Games
Bowls players at the 1938 British Empire Games
Commonwealth Games gold medallists for England
Commonwealth Games medallists in lawn bowls
1884 births
1963 deaths
Medallists at the 1930 British Empire Games
Medallists at the 1934 British Empire Games